The 2003 UMass Minutemen football team represented the University of Massachusetts Amherst in the 2003 NCAA Division I-AA football season as a member of the Atlantic 10 Conference (A-10).  The team was coached by Mark Whipple and played its home games at Warren McGuirk Alumni Stadium in Hadley, Massachusetts. The 2003 season was Whipple's last with UMass.  He left to take the position of quarterbacks coach with the NFL's Pittsburgh Steelers after the season.  It was a successful year for Whipple and the Minutemen as they returned to the NCAA Division I-AA playoffs for the first time since 1999 by virtue of winning the A-10 Conference championship.  UMass finished the season with a record of 10–3 overall and 8–1 in conference play.

Schedule

References

UMass
UMass Minutemen football seasons
Atlantic 10 Conference football champion seasons
UMass Minutemen football